Agee is a surname.  Notable people with the name include:

 Ann Agee (born 1959), American visual artist
 Arthur Agee (born 1972), American basketball player and subject of the documentary Hoop Dreams
 Chris Agee (born 1956), poet with dual Irish and American citizenship
 G. Steven Agee (born 1952), American judge
 James Agee (1909–1955), American novelist, poet, critic and screenwriter
 Lynne Agee (born 1948), American basketball coach
 Mary Cunningham Agee (born 1951), American former business executive, author, entrepreneur and philanthropist
 Mel Agee (1968–2008), American football player
 Mike Agee (1938–1990), American football player and coach
 Nancy Agee, American businesswoman
 Philip Agee (1935–2008), former CIA employee and author
 Ray Agee (1921–1989), American R&B singer and songwriter
 Sam Agee (1915–2006), American football player
 Sarah Agee (born 1946), American politician
 Steve Agee (born 1969), American actor
 Tajuan Agee (born 1997), American basketball player
 Tawatha Agee (born 1954), American singer and songwriter
 Tommie Agee (1942–2001), American baseball player
 Tommie Agee (born 1964), American football player
 William Agee (1905–1954), American long-distance runner
 William Agee (1938–2017), American business executive
 Evelyn Turrentine-Agee (born 1946), American gospel musician and artist